Reavis L. Mitchell Jr. (1947 – June 16, 2020) was an American historian and academic administrator. He was the dean of the School of Humanities and Behavioral Social Sciences and professor of history at Fisk University, a historically black university in Nashville, Tennessee. He was the chairman of the Tennessee Historical Commission from 2015 to 2020.

Early life and education
Mitchell was born in 1947 in Nashville, Tennessee. He attended St. Vincent de Paul Catholic School and Pearl High school, and he earned a Bachelor of Arts from Fisk University, Master of Science from Tennessee State University, and PhD from Middle Tennessee State University.

Career
Mitchell began his career as a member of the history faculty at Fisk University in 1980. He also worked as an adjunct professor at the University of St. Francis and Vanderbilt University. Mitchell held several administrative posts at Fisk, including Director of Institutional Advancement, Executive Assistant to the President, and Dean of Academic Affairs.

Mitchell served on the Tennessee Historical Commission from 2009 to his death, including as its chairman from 2015. He was also the executive vice president of the Tennessee Historical Society.

Death
Mitchell died on June 16, 2020, in Brentwood, at the age of 72. He is buried in Greenwood Cemetery.

Dr. Mitchell's life was honored at the 2021 Nashville Conference on African American History and Culture in Nashville, Tennessee. The conference produced a profile on him as part of the 2021 conference proceedings.

Personal life 
Mitchell had a wife, Dr. Patricia W. Mitchell, and four sons, Reavis L. Mitchell III, Roland W. Mitchell, Reagan P. Mitchell, and Roman B.W. Mitchell He resided in Brentwood, Tennessee, and he attended St. Vincent de Paul Church, a Catholic church in North Nashville.

Works

References

1947 births
2020 deaths
People from Brentwood, Tennessee
Fisk University alumni
Tennessee State University alumni
Middle Tennessee State University alumni
Fisk University faculty
Place of birth missing
Place of death missing
African-American historians
American university and college faculty deans
Historians from Tennessee
20th-century American historians
American male non-fiction writers
21st-century American historians
21st-century American male writers
African-American Catholics
20th-century American male writers
20th-century African-American writers
21st-century African-American writers
African-American male writers